Ralph Joseph "Jody" Reynolds (December 3, 1932 – November 7, 2008) was an American rock and roll singer, guitarist, and songwriter whose song "Endless Sleep" was a major U.S. top-ten hit in the summer of 1958. His follow-up single, "Fire of Love", peaked at only No. 66 on the Billboard chart, but the song went on to become a blues-punk classic after being covered by the MC5 and the Gun Club.

Reynolds was a regular on the "oldies" circuit and a successful businessman in the U.S. Southwest. Beginning in the 1980s several compilations of his music were issued in the U.S. and Europe, and he enjoyed modest acclaim as a pioneer of rockabilly music.

In 1999, Reynolds was honored with both a Golden Palm Star on the Palm Springs Walk of Stars in Palm Springs, California, and induction into the Rockabilly Hall of Fame.

Life and career
Ralph Joseph Reynolds was born in Denver, Colorado, United States, and was raised in the small town of Shady Grove, Oklahoma. Inspired by Western Swing and artists such as Bob Wills, Hank Thompson, and Eddy Arnold, who he heard on the radio, Reynolds took up guitar at age 14. He began playing rockabilly in Texas in the mid-1950s after hearing performers such as Elvis Presley, Carl Perkins, and Roy Orbison.

While performing in San Diego, California, Reynolds met music publisher Herb Montei. Montei rejected several songs offered by Reynolds, but after hearing his composition "Endless Sleep", got him signed to Demon Records and began managing him.

Inspired by the haunting sound of Elvis Presley's "Heartbreak Hotel", Reynolds wrote "Endless Sleep" while in Yuma, Arizona for a gig, and played it onstage the same night. Though a proficient guitarist himself, the studio recording of the song featured Al Casey and Howard Roberts on guitars. It had been written solely by Reynolds, but Demon Records credited it to Reynolds and the fictitious "Dolores Nance", to make it appear to have been written by a 'professional' songwriting team. With spooky, reverb-laden vocals, "Endless Sleep" tells the story of a young man desperately searching for his girlfriend, who, after an argument, has flung herself into the ocean. The label persuaded a reluctant Reynolds to change the lyrics to give the song a happy ending.

The song reached the No. 5 position on the U.S. Billboard Hot 100 chart on July 7, 1958, sold over one million copies, and inspired a trend of "teen tragedy" songs. Reynolds performed on American Bandstand and other TV shows, and was featured on concert tours organized by the disc jockey/promoter Alan Freed. "Endless Sleep" would later be covered by the Judds, John Fogerty, Nick Lowe and Billy Idol; Marty Wilde had a major hit with it in the UK, and Hank Williams, Jr.'s version was a modest country music chart success.

Reynolds' self-penned follow up single, "Fire of Love", became a rock and roll classic years later, after being revived by the MC5 and the Gun Club, but only reached No. 66 on the Billboard chart when released in August 1958, and was his last song to reach the Billboard Hot 100.  Unlike "Endless Sleep, "Fire of Love" is credited as being co-written by Reynolds, and his first wife, Sonja Sturdivant.

Reynolds recorded several more singles, both with Demon and other labels, including duets with Bobbie Gentry, two songs written by Marty Cooper and Lee Hazlewood, and two hot instrumentals released under the name "The Storms" (Reynolds' backing band). By the mid-1960s he had settled in Palm Springs, where he focused on raising a family and working as a realtor; however, he retained his lifelong love of music, writing and recording songs in a small home studio, occasionally performing in "oldies" shows, and opening a music store.

Col. Tom Parker, Elvis Presley's manager, signed Reynolds to his Boxcar Publishing Co., thinking Presley might be interested in some of his songs, though Presley died in 1977 before recording any of them. Reynolds included one of the songs he had written for Presley, "Yesterday and Today", on a 1978 album.

Starting in the late 1970s, "Endless Sleep" and other of Reynolds' songs were re-released in Europe and America; the rockabilly revival beginning in the mid-1970s (Hank Mizell's "Jungle Rock" hit the UK top ten in 1976) saw a further increase of interest in his music.

Reynolds died of liver cancer on November 7, 2008, in Palm Desert, California, at age 75. He was survived by Judy, his wife of 47 years, daughters Malinda and Marla, son Mark and granddaughter Desiree.

Recordings
 Demon Records
 1507 "Endless Sleep" / "Tight Capris" – March 1958
 1509 "Fire of Love" / "Daisy Mae" – July 1958
 1511 "Closin' In" / "Elope With Me" – November 1958
 1515 "Golden Idol" / "Beaulah Lee" – March 1959
 1519 "The Storm" / "Please Remember Me" – August 1959
 1523 "The Whipping Post" / "I Wanna Be With You Tonight" – April 1960
 1524 "Stone Cold" / "(The Girl With The) Raven Hair" – June 1960
 Sundown Records
 114 "Thunder" / "Tarantula" – January 1959
 Indigo Records
 127 "Thunder" / "Tarantula" – August 1961
 Emmy Records
 1011 "Dusty Skies" / "Brandy" 1962
 Smash Records
 1810 "Don't Jump" / "Stormy" – February 1963
 Brent Records
 7042 "The Girl From King Marie" / "Raggedy Ann" – April 1963
 Titan Records
 1734 "A Tear For Jesse" / "Devil Girl" – 1965
 1736 "Stranger in the Mirror" / "Requiem For Love" (with Bobbie Gentry) – 1965
 Pulsar Records
 2419 "Endless Sleep" / "My Baby's Eyes" – 1969
 Gusto Records
 0026 "Endless Sleep" / [unknown] 1976
 Tru Gems Records
 LP 1002 Endless Sleep 1978
 Gee Dee Music
 270106 Endless Sleep (CD) (Germany, 1994)
 270142 Endless Sleep (CD) (Germany, 1998)
 Ace Records LTD
 CDCHD 1474 -  The Complete Demon & Titan Masters (England, 2016)

References

External links
 Jody Reynolds 
 Jody Reynolds Page
 Reynolds, Jody (RCS Artist Discography)
 Jody Reynolds, 75, Rockabilly Singer, Is Dead
 Jody Reynolds - The Complete Demon & Titan Masters - Ace Records 

1932 births
2008 deaths
Deaths from cancer in California
Deaths from liver cancer
Musicians from Denver
People from McIntosh County, Oklahoma
Apex Records artists
Smash Records artists
20th-century American musicians